Marilyn Pappas  (b. 1931, Brockton, Massachusetts) is an American artist known for fiber art. She attended the Massachusetts College of Art and Design (MassArt) and Pennsylvania State University. She taught at MassArt from 1974 through 1994 retiring as professor emerita. Pappas' work is in the collections of the Krannert Art Museum, the Museum of Arts and Design, NYC, the Museum of Fine Arts, Houston,  and the Museum of Fine Arts Boston, Her work, Nike with Broken Wings, was acquired by the Smithsonian American Art Museum as part of the Renwick Gallery's 50th Anniversary Campaign. In 2022 the Fuller Craft Museum held a retrospective of her work.

References

Further reading
photo of Opera Coat on the cover of the November/December 1969 issue of Craft Horizons
Nevertheless She Persisted: Marilyn Pappas’ 60-year career by By Caroline Kipp in the Summer 2022 Craft Quarterly

1931 births
Living people
Artists from Massachusetts
20th-century women artists
American women artists